Moses Hicks Grinnell (March 3, 1803 – November 24, 1877) was a United States Congressman representing New York, and a Commissioner of New York City's Central Park.

Early life
Grinnell was born in New Bedford, Massachusetts, on March 3, 1803. He was the son of Cornelius Grinnell (1758–1850) and Sylvia (née Howland) Grinnell (1765–1837). His siblings included Henry Grinnell and Joseph Grinnell.

After attending public school, he took his first paying job at the age of 15, working in the counting room of a bank in New York City.

Shipping career
In 1815, his brother Joseph Grinnell helped to establish the shipping firm Grinnell, Minturn & Co. Moses and his brother, Henry Grinnell, became members of the firm in 1825. In 1830, Robert Bowne Minturn joined the firm and it became Grinnell & Minturn. The company stayed active until 1880.

Grinnell became a successful New York merchant and shipper and was subsequently appointed as president of the New York Chamber of Commerce. The pilot boat Moses H. Grinnell, was built in 1850 for the Jersey pilots and designed by George Steers. She was owned by George W. Blunt of New York. The Grinnell was the first pilot boat to show the fully developed long entry that was to become the New York schooner's trade mark.

The shipping company is best known for owning the clipper ship Flying Cloud. Grinnell bought her from Donald McKay in 1851 for $90,000.

Political career
However, unlike his brother Joseph Grinnell, who represented Massachusetts for four terms as a Whig, Moses did not stick to a single political party. He was first a Democrat, then became a Whig in the 1830s, was an "out-and-out Native American party man" the 1840s, and in the 1850s joined the newly founded Republican Party, for which he served as a presidential elector in 1856.

In February 1860, president-elect Abraham Lincoln, on his way to Washington, D.C., visited the Manhattan home of Grinnell's daughter, whose father had invited many of New York City's most prominent businessmen to meet the first Republican president. Grinnell subsequently wrote Lincoln with introductions for others, becoming something of a conduit of political power, if not a wielder of such himself.

Grinnell was Collector of the Port of New York from March 1869 to July 1870, and the Port's Naval Officer of Customs from July 1870 to April 1871.  Perhaps best remembered for his work as Central Park Commissioner during the early years of the urban park's design and construction.

Personal life
Moses Grinnell died in Manhattan on November 24, 1877. His funeral service was at the Unitarian Church of All Souls and he was buried in Sleepy Hollow Cemetery, Sleepy Hollow, New York.

References

Further reading
 

 

 
 

1803 births
1877 deaths
American businesspeople in shipping
Collectors of the Port of New York
Burials at Sleepy Hollow Cemetery
Politicians from New Bedford, Massachusetts
New York (state) Democrats
New York (state) Republicans
Whig Party members of the United States House of Representatives from New York (state)
1856 United States presidential electors
19th-century American politicians
19th-century American businesspeople